Anita Louise Nivala (born 1961) is a Canadian international lawn bowler.

Bowls career
She won a silver medal in the fours with Shirley Fitzpatrick-Wong, Andrea Weigand and Melissa Ranger at the 1998 Commonwealth Games in Kuala Lumpur. 

Two years later she just missed out on a medal after losing the bronze medal play off to New Zealand at the 2004 World Outdoor Bowls Championship - Women's Triples. She plays for the Regina Lawn Bowling Club in Regina, Saskatchewan.

She won three medals at the Asia Pacific Bowls Championships including a gold medal in the 1993 fours, in Victoria, Canada.

References

Living people
1961 births
Bowls players at the 1998 Commonwealth Games
Bowls players at the 2002 Commonwealth Games
Canadian female bowls players
Commonwealth Games medallists in lawn bowls
Commonwealth Games silver medallists for Canada
20th-century Canadian women
21st-century Canadian women
Medallists at the 2002 Commonwealth Games